Frotho I is one of the legendary Danish kings in Saxo Grammaticus' Gesta Danorum, where he has a substantial biography. He succeeds his father Hadingus to the throne and replenishes the war-drained treasury by slaying a dragon and winning its treasure. He uses the money to finance expeditions into the Baltic, where he wins victories with clever strategems (including one where he crossdresses as one of his own shieldmaidens). After some trouble at home he campaigns successfully in Britain and captures London. He finally dies in a war against the king of Sweden.

See also
 Fróði

References
 Davidson, Hilda Ellis (ed.) and Peter Fisher (tr.) (1999). Saxo Grammaticus : The History of the Danes : Books I-IX. Bury St Edmunds: St Edmundsbury Press. . First published 1979-1980.
 Elton, Oliver (tr.) (1905). The Nine Books of the Danish History of Saxo Grammaticus. New York: Norroena Society. Available online
 Olrik, J. and H. Ræder (1931). Saxo Grammaticus : Gesta Danorum. Available online

Mythological kings of Denmark